Software Package Data Exchange (SPDX) is an open standard for software bill of materials (SBOM). SPDX allows the expression of components,  licenses, copyrights, security references and other metadata relating to software. Its original purpose was to improve license compliance, and has since been expanded to facilitate additional use-cases, such as supply-chain transparency and security. SPDX is authored by the community-driven SPDX Project under the auspices of the Linux Foundation.

The current version of the standard is 2.3.

Version history 

The first version of the SPDX specification was intended to make compliance with software licenses easier, but subsequent versions of the specification added capabilities intended for other use-cases, such as being able to contain references to known software vulnerabilities. Recent versions of SPDX fulfill the NTIA's 'Minimum Elements For a Software Bill of Materials'. 

SPDX 2.2.1 was submitted to the International Organization for Standardization (ISO) in October, 2020, and was published as ISO/IEC 5962:2021 Information technology — SPDX® Specification V2.2.1 in August, 2021.

License syntax 
Each license is identified by a full name, such as "Mozilla Public License 2.0" and a short identifier, here "MPL-2.0".
Licenses can be combined by operators AND and OR, and grouping.

For example, (Apache-2.0 OR MIT) means that one can choose between Apache-2.0 (Apache License) or MIT (MIT license). On the other hand, (Apache-2.0 AND MIT) means that both licenses apply.

There is also a "+" operator, when applied to a license, means that future versions of the license apply as well. For example, Apache-1.1+ means that Apache-1.1 and Apache-2.0 may apply (and future versions if any).

SPDX describes the exact terms under which a piece of software is licensed. It does not attempt to categorize licenses by type, for instance by describing licenses with similar terms to the BSD License as "BSD-like".

In 2020, the European Commission publishes its Joinup Licensing Assistant, which makes possible the selection and comparison of more than 50 licenses, with access to their SPDX identifier and full text.

Deprecated license identifiers 

The GNU family of licenses (e.g., GNU General Public License version 2) have the choice of choosing a later version of the license built in. Sometimes, it was not clear, whether the SPDX expression GPL-2.0 meant "exactly GPL version 2.0" or "GPL version 2.0 or any later version". Thus, since version 3.0 of the SPDX License List, the GNU family of licenses got new names. GPL-2.0-only means "exactly version 2.0" and GPL-2.0-or-later means "version 2.0 or any later version".

See also
 License proliferation

References

External links 
 
 SPDX on the ISO website
 Linux Foundation Open Compliance Program
 Nathan Willis: A SPDX case study LWN.net

Computer standards
Linux Foundation projects
ISO standards
IEC standards